Maggie Winters is an American sitcom television series created by Kari Lizer starring Faith Ford as the title character. The series aired on CBS from September 30, 1998, to February 3, 1999.

Plot
Recently divorced from her dentist husband, Maggie Winters moved in with her mother Estelle in her home town of Shelbyville, Indiana and got a job at Hanley's, a local department store.

Cast

Main cast 
Faith Ford as Maggie Winters
Shirley Knight  as Estelle Winters
 Jenny Robertson  as Robin Foster
Alex Kapp Horner  as Lisa Harte
Brian Haley  as Tom Vanderhulst
Clea Lewis as Rachel Tomlinson

Recurring cast 
 Brianna & Brittany McConnell as Katie Foster
 Michael McKean as Lewis Stickley
 Patrick Warburton as Sonny Mayfield

Notable guest stars 
 Edward Asner as Nathan Winters
 Shelley Duvall as Muriel
 Nathan Fillion as Ronald
 Steven Gilborn as Mr. Undercoffler
 Judy Greer as Tawny
 Ken Berry as Sheriff Riley
 David James Elliott as Jack
 Kevin Weisman as Harold
 Paul Sand as Brad
 Gregory Harrison as Mr. Wiehe
 Steve Franken as Mr. Addison

Series overview

Episodes

External links

Television series by CBS Studios
CBS original programming
1990s American sitcoms
1998 American television series debuts
1999 American television series endings
Television shows set in Indiana
Television series by 20th Century Fox Television